Sandro Quintarelli (born 23 September 1945) is an Italian former professional racing cyclist. He rode in the 1971 and 1975 Tour de France as well as in seven editions of the Giro d'Italia.

Major results
1970
 5th Giro del Piemonte
 6th Trofeo Matteotti
 10th GP Montelupo
1972
 9th Gran Premio Industria e Commercio di Prato
1973
 4th Overall Giro di Sicilia

Grand Tour general classification results timeline

References

External links
 

1945 births
Living people
Italian male cyclists
Cyclists from the Province of Verona